A staple knocker is a tool resembling a screwdriver, used for removing staples and shredded material. It is called a knocker because a hammer can be used to hit the end of it and remove long lines of shorter staples.

See also
Staple remover

Mechanical hand tools